is a junction railway station in the town of Misato, Miyagi, Japan, operated by East Japan Railway Company (JR East).

Lines
Kogota Station is served by three lines: the Tōhoku Main Line, the Ishinomaki Line, and the Rikuu East Line. It is located 395.0 rail kilometers from the terminus of the Tōhoku Main Line at Tokyo Station. It is the eastern terminus of the Rikuu East Line and the western terminus of the Ishinomaki Line. Most Kesennuma Line trains use Kogota station as their operating terminus, although the line physically ends at Maeyachi Station.

Station layout
Kogota Station has two island platforms serving four tracks. The platforms are connected by a footbridge. The station has a "Midori no Madoguchi" staffed ticket office.

Platforms

History

Kogota Station opened on April 16, 1890, on what would become the Tōhoku Main Line. The Ishinomaki Line opened on October 28, 1912, and the Rikuu Line (Rikuu East Line) opened on April 20, 1913. The station was absorbed into the JR East network upon the privatization of JNR on April 1, 1987.

Passenger statistics
In fiscal 2018, the station was used by an average of 2,066 passengers daily (boarding passengers only).

Surrounding area
Kogota Post Office

See also
 List of Railway Stations in Japan

References

External links

  

Railway stations in Miyagi Prefecture
Tōhoku Main Line
Rikuu East Line
Ishinomaki Line
Railway stations in Japan opened in 1890
Misato, Miyagi
Stations of East Japan Railway Company